Kalle Flygt (born 15 June 1976) is a former professional tennis player from Sweden.

Biography
Flygt, who comes from Uppsala, made his earliest ATP Tour appearances in doubles, at Båstad in 1995 and 1996. 

He played singles at the 1998 Japan Open Tennis Championships where he was beaten in the first round by Brian MacPhie. When he returned to the Tokyo event in 2000 he was more successful, with wins over 11th seed Mariano Zabaleta and Brazil's André Sá, before being eliminated by Byron Black in the round of 16. 

In 2001 he competed in the main singles draw at Båstad and was runner-up in the doubles at a Challenger tournament in Brasov.

References

External links
 
 

1976 births
Living people
Swedish male tennis players
Sportspeople from Uppsala